WAWL-LP (103.5 FM, "103.5 WAWL") is a radio station licensed to serve the community of Grand Haven, Michigan. The station is owned by Tri-Cities Broadcasting Foundation and airs a community radio format.

The station was assigned the WAWL-LP call letters by the Federal Communications Commission on January 29, 2014.

References

External links
 Official Website
 FCC Public Inspection File for WAWL-LP
 

AWL-LP
AWL-LP
Radio stations established in 2014
2014 establishments in Michigan
Community radio stations in the United States
Ottawa County, Michigan